is a Japanese anime series produced by TYO Animations. It follows the Momoyama Predators, an association football team formed by elementary school students.

The series was distributed by NHK and broadcast on NHK General TV and NHK BS-Premium from April 3, 2012 to February 26, 2013

Characters

Shou is a sixth grader, and in the beginning, he is the last remaining member of the Momoyama Predators and because of that the Manager disbands the team. Shou loves football, even though he is pretty bad at it. Despite all that, he goes off to try to find members to revive the team. First he meets Erika and her dog practicing football in the park and immediately asks her to join. After "recruiting" Erika, they have a falling-out when she realizes that there is no team for her to really join. The two come across Misaki Shimizu in the park where they were playing and challenge her to a 2 v 1 match. The two are crushed but in the end Shou manages to steal the ball and score. Shou is very strong-willed and loud, and though his football skills aren't so good in the beginning he gets better over time. His greatest asset is his ability to never take his eye off the ball and to see the patterns in the way players move. Misaki says that he will grow to become an amazing football player some day. Shou typically plays left defender.

She is a sixth-grader originally from Osaka and is the former ace of the Namba Dandelions. Back then, she was known as the Speed Star due to her speed with the ball. It appears as though her team was also disbanded and she transferred to Shou's school. She has a bit of a complex about boys, saying that they are better than her because she is a girl and in several instances is deeply hurt and angered by it. After meeting Misaki Shimizu and Shou, she learns that women can be great players as well and that there is room for her to get "level up" if she doesn't give up. Erika is cheerful, full of energy, and very frank. She has a crush on Aoto. She typically plays left forward.

Kota is the first brother of the "Triplet Demons", and possesses great reflexes and athleticism which allow him to be naturally good at any sport, such as tennis, which is what the three brothers were practicing at the beginning of the anime. His heart longs to play football and though he doesn't speak much, when it comes to football he gets fired up and annoyed easily. He and his brothers want to be the best and he feels that in order for that to happen that they need an amazing coach. It is hinted that he is the one that initiated the breakaway from Momoyama Predators because the original coach was terrible. Kota has a vicious kick and typically plays center forward. His favorite color is yellow.

Ryuuji is the second brother of the "Triplet Demons", and possesses great reflexes and athleticism which allow him to be naturally good at any sport, such as tennis which is what the three brothers were practicing at the beginning of the anime. His heart longs to play football and when he gets the chance to he gets all fired up. Ryuuji, with his two brothers, left the Momoyama Predators due to the original coach being terrible and as a result many of the other players left leaving only Shou. Ryuuji is mild mannered in comparison to Kota and Ouzou and seems to be the most intelligent out of the three of them. Ryuuji has incredible ball control and typically plays center mid-field. His favorite color is green.

Ouzou is the third brother of the "Triplet Demons", and possesses great reflexes and athleticism which allow him to be naturally good at any sport, such as tennis which is what the three brothers were practicing at the beginning of the anime. His heart longs to play football and when he gets the chance to he gets all fired up. Ouzou, with his two brothers, left the Momoyama Predators due to the original coach being terrible and as a result many of the other players left leaving only Shou. Ouzou is the most boisterous of the brothers and comes off more like a delinquent. Ouzou excels in defense and typically plays right defender. His favorite color is red.

Reika is a large girl that is friends with Erika and is in the same class as Erika and Shou. She has a kind and quiet personality. Despite being large, she has an affinity for football. When the team needs one more player to qualify for the preliminaries, Reika steps up. Originally she states that she wants to play football for dieting, which really angered the Furuyas (especially Kota). She finds that she loves football and pushes hard to prove herself to the team. It is shown that she is in a well-to-do family and that she is secretly skipping her piano lessons to practice football under her mother's nose. She is a hard worker and is seen early in the morning practicing hard so that she won't be a burden for the team.

A member of the Heavens FC, he has a rivalry with Kota of the Triplet Demons because he managed to score three goals against them which has Kota up in arms about it. Aoto is actually quite small for his age but has amazing ball control and shooting ability. He is half-Japanese and half-Spanish as indicated by his last names. However, he joins the Momoyama Predators in hopes of going to Spain in order to meet his father.

 A close friend of Aoto's and new goalie of the Momoyama Predators. He is half-Arabic and half-japanese. He used to play football with Aoto, but quit when he got discouraged from his increasing number of goalie errors. However, he begins to miss playing football. Aoto and Tagi both join at the same time and can once again watch over each other on the field.

Uchimura, Uematsu, and Ukishima are all friends whose last names start with U, thus they are typically called 3U. They were originally part of the Momoyama Predators but left when the Triplet Demons did on the pretense of having to study for their middle school entrance exams. Uematsu plays with his hair tied back and played as a right forward in the matches against New Tokyo FC women's club teams.

Uchimura, Uematsu, and Ukishima are all friends whose last names start with U, thus they are typically called 3U. They were originally part of the Momoyama Predators but left when the Triplet Demons did on the pretense of having to study for their middle school entrance exams. Ukishima has pretty good reflexes and can pretty much play any position. In the beginning he plays as a goalkeeper in the team's matches against New Tokyo FC women's club teams.

Uchimura, Uematsu, and Ukishima are all friends whose last names start with U, thus they are typically called 3U. They were originally part of the Momoyama Predators but left when the Triplet Demons did on the pretense of having to study for their middle school entrance exams. Uchimura is of a smaller build and has a bit of a bowl haircut. He played as a midfielder alongside Ryuuji Furuya in the matches against New Tokyo FC women's club teams.

Introduced as a random drunkard on a park bench, Masaru was actually a professional football player that went by the name Lightning Light ace of the Chiba Thunderbolts. He possesses a lightning fast right kick. After watching him drunkenly dribble and head the ball, Shou gets Masaru(after numerous requests) to teach him how to head the ball. Shortly after he tries to get him to coach their football team. He initially refuses due to his past as a coach, but after a few games with the children and their(mainly Shou's) constant nagging he finally accepts. Masaru is easily provoked, as seen multiple times where the Furuya brothers get under his skin eventually forcing him to show off his professional football skills. He hates being called "Old man" because he believes that he isn't really that old.

He originally disbanded the Momoyama Predators due to lack of players(Shou being the only one left in the beginning) but after being approached by Shou who had managed to get the players and a coach(who was a player in the J League and who coached a previous team to the Best 8 of the National Tournament) together he reconsidered. He has a standing rivalry with the manager of Tsubakimori SC and as a requirement of Masaru being a coach and the Momoyama Predators being active again, they MUST defeat Tsubakimori SC and qualify for the district tournament.

A member of the Amarillo FC, an elementary affiliate of the New Tokyo FC. He is known as the Emperor and is quite large and built for a sixth grader. Little is known about him other than he wants to play against the Furuyas very badly. He also has an amazing memory as he remembered Shou was in the Momoyama Predators having only seen him in the huddle once a year ago.

Captain of the Tsubakimori SC, a team managed by the business rival of the manager of the Momoyama Predators. He is first seen trying to force two other players to join him in a 3v3 against the Furuya brothers. When they run away, he gets Shou and Erika to play with them. He has a commanding presence on the field but his skills pale in comparison to the Furuya brothers.

A member of Rosa of New Tokyo FC, she plays the forward position and is known for her speed. She meets Shou and Erika in a park while she is training after an injury and is challenged to a 2v1 by them. After completely dominating them, Shou in the end manages to steal the ball from her and score. Shou asks her to be their coach but being a professional player she had to decline, but wanting to help their cause however she can, she gave them her cell number. She later invites Shou and Erika to a practice with her team and sub teams, which they get to participate in. After showing great promise, Misaki tells the two that they are welcome back after they form a team. She also gives Erika advice on how to deal with playing against boys and saying that it's ok for her to do so at the elementary level. Shou comes back with a team including the Furuya triplets to challenge the women's league, shooting to ultimately play against Misaki's Rosas. They get their wish after crushing the sub teams and are subsequently squashed by them, though their skill still impressed Misaki and the others. She wishes the team well and appears to support them from the background. Misaki was also a founding member of the Namba Dandelions, having drawn up the poorly drawn characters on Erika's poster when she was young.

A fifth grade goalkeeper of decent skill that is picked by Masaru to play with Momoyama Predators in order to qualify for games.

A fifth grade midfielder of decent skill that is picked by Masaru to play with Momoyama Predators in order to qualify for games.

Episode list
Encounter
Speed Star
Triplet Demons
Lightning Light
Coach
The 11th Player
Three Tactics
Kickoff!!
Breakthrough
Suguro Special
Counter Attack!
The Young Lady Covered in Mud
Demon Extermination
Own Goal
Strong Point
3U's Decision
Ball to the Future
First Goal
The Genius Striker
No Guard
Teamplay
Tears
Team Disbanded
Blind Football
New Friends 
A Shocking Training Camp
The Promised Ticket
The Reborn Predators
Change
The Deciding Match
Despair and Hope
End of the Fierce Battle
Fate of Victory
To Barcelona 
Start for Galaxy
Night Before Final
At Plaza Catalunya
World's Strongest Force
World Cup of Galaxy

References

External links
  
 

2012 anime television series debuts
Association football in anime and manga
NHK original programming
Anime with original screenplays
Yumeta Company
2013 Japanese television series endings
Shueisha manga